Alexia Hilbertidou is a New Zealand social entrepreneur and the founder of GirlBoss New Zealand, a social enterprise which aims to empower women in leadership, entrepreneurship, science, technology, engineering and mathematics. GirlBoss has attracted 13,000 members, and has become New Zealand’s largest women’s network.

Life
Hilbertidou was born in Cyprus, and moved to New Zealand whilst still a baby. She is of Greek and Samoan descent.

She was educated at Albany Senior High School, Auckland. She studied digital IT and physics, and found that she was frequently the only girl in the classes. At 16, she founded GirlBoss New Zealand as a way to encourage teenage girls to participate more fully in leadership, entrepreneurship, science, technology, engineering, and maths. GirlBoss events have featured guest speakers such as My Food Bag founder Theresa Gattung, Green Party candidate Chloe Swarbrick, Labour leader Jacinda Ardern, and Xero's Anna Curzon. Hilbertidou is a strong advocate for equity of access and for ensuring every young woman in New Zealand, regardless of their socioeconomic status, can succeed.

Recognition 

In 2016, Hilbertidou won the Young Leader Award, an award given to the most influential New Zealand woman under at the age of 25, at the New Zealand Women of Influence Awards. She is an Eisenhower Youth Fellow and New Zealand's representative at the Global Teen Leader Summit. She also received the AIMES Bellingham Wallace Emergent Talent Award, which enabled her to work full-time on GirlBoss. In July 2017, Hilbertidou was invited by NASA to be part of the SOFIA Project and ride onboard NASA's 747 jumbo jet during an overnight exploratory mission. She is the youngest person to receive such an invitation. Hilbertidou is also the youngest member of the Super Diverse Women Network led by Mai Chen.

In 2018 Hilbertidou received a Queen's Young Leader Award for her work founding GirlBoss. In 2021, Hilbertidou was named part of the Forbes' list '30 under 30 Asia', as a featured honoree.

References

External links 
 GirlBoss New Zealand

Living people
21st-century New Zealand people
People from Auckland
New Zealand Women of Influence Award recipients
New Zealand people of Greek descent
New Zealand people of Samoan descent
Recipients of the Queen’s Young Leader Award
1999 births